Arybbas was a somatophylax of Alexander the Great. He was probably from Epirus, a member of the Molossian royal house (i.e., a relative of Olympias). He died of illness in Egypt in the winter of 332 BC and was replaced by Leonnatus.

References
Who's Who in the Age of Alexander the Great by Waldemar Heckel

Generals of Alexander the Great
Ancient Epirotes
Somatophylakes
4th-century BC Greek people